Sir Richard William George (24 April 1944 – 23 March 2016) was a British food manufacturer who turned the Weetabix company into a major British brand.

He was knighted in 1995 for his services to the food industry.

References 

1944 births
2016 deaths
British businesspeople
Businesspeople awarded knighthoods
Knights Bachelor